Topraklı can refer to:

 Topraklı, Bismil
 Topraklı, Karaisalı
 Topraklı, Karataş